Çayönü is a village in the Kozluk District, Batman Province, Turkey. Its population is 1,194 (2021).

The hamlets of Çakırlar, Dere, Dilimli, İncili, Kesmetaş, Kurşunlu and Yeniköy are attached to the village.

References

Villages in Kozluk District

Kurdish settlements in Batman Province